The River Wear is home to a number of sports rowing clubs. These clubs are based in Durham, Chester-le-Street and Sunderland. All clubs are members of British Rowing and all the Durham College clubs are members of Durham College Rowing.

Durham
In Durham, there are a number of clubs based on the river.

Chester-le-Street
In Chester-le-Street there is one club on the river:

Sunderland
In Sunderland there are two rowing clubs:

See also
Durham College Rowing

River Wear
Sport in Durham, England
City of Sunderland
England sport-related lists
River Wear